Vivek Malek (born 1977) is an Indian-born American attorney, businessman, and politician who is the State Treasurer of Missouri, following his appointment to the position by Governor Mike Parson. He is a member of the Republican Party.

Early life and education
Malek was born and raised in India. He graduated from Maharshi Dayanand University with a Bachelor of Arts degree and a Juris Doctor, and went on to receive a Master of Business Administration from Southeast Missouri State University and a Master of Laws from the University of Illinois College of Law.

Career
Malek began practicing law in Missouri in 2006. In 2011, he established his law firm, Law Offices of Vivek Malek, with a focus on immigration law. The Missouri House of Representatives and Senate recognized "his service and contributions to Missouri communities" in 2007 and 2015, respectively, and the St. Louis Business Journal awarded him their Minority Business Leader Award in 2010. He also appeared on Business Today's list of "30 under 30." In 2020, Missouri Governor Mike Parson appointed him to the board of governors of his alma mater, Southeast Missouri State University.

On December 20, 2022, Parson appointed Malek Treasurer of Missouri, following Scott Fitzpatrick's election as State Auditor. He became the first person of color to hold statewide office in Missouri. He has stated his intention to run for a full term in 2024.

Personal life
Malek resides in Wildwood, Missouri, with his wife, Riju, and their three children.

References

1977 births
American politicians of Indian descent
Asian-American people in Missouri politics
Indian emigrants to the United States
Living people
Maharshi Dayanand University alumni
Politicians from St. Louis County, Missouri
Southeast Missouri State University alumni
State treasurers of Missouri
University of Illinois College of Law alumni